Bodish, named for the Tibetan ethnonym Bod, is a proposed grouping consisting of the Tibetic languages and associated Sino-Tibetan languages spoken in Tibet, North India, Nepal, Bhutan, and North Pakistan.
It has not been demonstrated that all these languages form a clade, characterized by shared innovations, within Sino-Tibetan.

Shafer, who coined the term "Bodish", used it for two different levels in his classification, called "section" and "branch" respectively:

 Bodish
 Bodish
 West Bodish
 Central Bodish
 South Bodish
 East Bodish
 Gurung (Tamangic)
 Tshangla
 Rgyalrongic

It is now generally accepted that the languages Shafer placed in the first three subgroups are all descended from Old Tibetan, and should be combined as a Tibetic subgroup, with the East Bodish languages as a sister subgroup.
More recent classifications omit Rgyalrongic, which is considered a separate branch of Sino-Tibetan.

Bradley (1997) also defined a broad "Bodish" group, adding the West Himalayish languages, which Shafer treated as a sibling of his Bodish section.  The resulting grouping is roughly equivalent to the "Tibeto-Kanauri" group in other classifications. Within this grouping, Bodish proper is a subgroup with two branches, Tibetic and East Bodish:

 Bodish
 
 
 Central Bodish (Tibetic)
 East Bodish
 West Bodish (Tamangic)
 Tshangla, Lhokpu, Gongduk
 West Himalayish

East Bodish is among the least researched branches of Sino-Tibetan. Languages regarded as members of this family include Bumthang (Michailovsky and Mazaudon 1994; van Driem 1995), Tshangla (Hoshi 1987; Andvik 1999), Dakpa (Lu 1986; Sun et al. 1991), Zhangzhung (Nagano and LaPolla 2001), and maybe Zakhring (Blench & Post 2011).

According to Shafer, East Bodish is the most conservative branch of the Bodish languages.

As for grammars of the East Bodish languages, there is Das Gupta (1968) and Lu (2002). Some papers on Kurtöp include Hyslop (2008a, 2008b, 2009).

References

 
 van Driem, George (1994). East Bodish and Proto-Tibeto-Burman morphosyntax. Current Issues in Sino-Tibetan Linguistics, Osaka: The Organizing Committee of the 26th International Conference on Sino-Tibetan Languages and Linguistics.
 van Driem, George (1995). Een eerste grammaticale verkenning van het Bumthang, een taal van midden-Bhutan. Leiden: Onderzoekschool CNWS.
 van Driem, George  (2001) Languages of the Himalayas: An Ethnolinguistic Handbook of the Greater Himalayan Region. Brill.
 
 Hyslop, G., (2008a). Kurtöp phonology in the context of Northeast India. In: Morey, S., Post, M. (Eds.), North East Indian Linguistics 1: Papers from the First International Conference of the North East Indian Linguistic Society. Cambridge University Press, Cambridge, pp. 3–25.
Hyslop, G., (2008b). "Kurtöp and the classification of the languages of Bhutan." In: Proceedings from the 42nd Annual Meeting of the Chicago Linguistic Society 42, vol. 2, South Asian Linguistics, Case, Voice, and Language Coexistence. University of Chicago Press, Chicago.
Hyslop, G., (2009), "Kurtöp Tone: A tonogenetic case study." Lingua 119: 827–845
Lu shao zun 陸紹尊(2002). 門巴語方言研究 Menbayu fangyan yanjiu [Studies in the dialects of the Monpa language.] Beijing: 民族出版社 Minzu chubanshe.
Michailovsky, Boyd and Martine Mazaudon (1994). “Preliminary Notes on the Languages of the Bumthang Group (Bhutan).” Tibetan Studies: proceedings of the 6th Seminar of the International Association for Tibetan Studies. Ed. Per Kværne. Vol 2. Oslo: The Institute of Comparative Research in Human Culture. 545-557.
 
  (preprint)